The 1923 Invercargill mayoral election was held on 26 April 1923 as part of that year's local elections.

Results
The following table gives the election results:

References

1923 elections in New Zealand
Mayoral elections in Invercargill